Trioceros camerunensis, the Cameroon dwarf chameleon, is a species of chameleon endemic to Cameroon.

References

Trioceros
Reptiles described in 1909
Taxa named by Lorenz Müller
Reptiles of Cameroon